The discography of Canadian electronic music producer Excision consists of four studio albums, three compilation albums, five extended plays, twenty-nine singles, and twelve DJ mixes.

Albums

Studio albums

Compilation albums

Extended plays

Singles

Mixes

References

Discographies of Canadian artists
Electronic music discographies